Non-judicial punishment (or NJP) is a disciplinary measure that may be applied to individual military personnel, without a need for a court martial or similar proceedings.

United States
In the United States Armed Forces, non-judicial punishment is a form of military justice authorized by Article 15 of the Uniform Code of Military Justice. Its rules are further elaborated on in various branch policy as well as the Manual for Courts-Martial. NJP permits commanders to administratively discipline troops without a court-martial. Punishment can range from reprimand to reduction in rank, correctional custody, loss of pay, extra duty or restrictions depending on rank of the imposing officer and receiving officer. The receipt of non-judicial punishment does not constitute a criminal conviction (it is equivalent to a civil action), but is often placed in the service record of the individual. The process for non-judicial punishment is governed by Part V of the Manual for Courts-Martial and by each service branch's regulations.

Non-judicial punishment proceedings are known by different terms among the services. In the Army and the Air Force, non-judicial punishment is referred to as Article 15; in the Marine Corps it is called being "NJP'd", being sent to "Office Hours", or satirically amongst the junior ranks, "Ninja Punched". The Navy and the Coast Guard call non-judicial punishment captain's mast or admiral's mast, depending on the rank of the commanding officer.

Hearing
Prior to imposition of NJP, the commander will notify the accused of the commander's intention to impose punishment, the nature of the misconduct alleged, supporting evidence, and a statement of the accused's rights under the UCMJ. All service members, except those embarked or attached to a vessel currently away from its homeport, have a right to refuse NJP and request a court-martial. If the accused does not accept the NJP, the NJP hearing is terminated and the commander must make the decision of whether to process the service member for court-martial. If the accused accepts NJP, he or she can choose to have a hearing or waive said right. If a hearing proceeds, the accused may choose to be accompanied by a spokesperson. The accused may present evidence and witnesses to the commander. The commander must consider any information offered during the hearing, and must be personally convinced that the service member committed misconduct before imposing punishment.

Punishments
Maximum penalties depend on the rank of the accused and that of the officer imposing punishment:

For officers accused of misconduct
If the officer imposing punishment holds General Court Martial authority, or if the commanding officer is of the grade O-7 or greater
 Arrest in quarters: not more than 30 days
 Restriction to limits: not more than 60 days
 Forfeiture of pay: not more than ½ of one month's base pay for two months (base pay does not include allowances or special pay)
 Admonition or reprimand

By Commanding Officers of the grades O-4 to O-6
 Restriction to limits: not more than 30 days
 Admonition or reprimand

By Commanding Officers of the grades O-1 to O-3
 Restriction to limits: not more than 15 days
 Admonition or reprimand

By Officers In Charge (OIC)
 No NJP authority over officers

For enlisted members accused of misconduct
There are three types of non-judicial punishment commonly imposed.

Summary Article 15: (O-3 and below) commanders and commissioned OIC may impose:
 Restriction to specific limits (normally work, barracks, place of worship, mess hall, and medical facilities) for not more than 14 days
 Extra duties, including fatigue or other duties, for not more than 14 days
 Restriction with extra duties for not more than 14 days

Company Grade (O-3 or below) commanders may impose the above plus:
 Correctional Custody for not more than 7 days (only if accused is in the grades E-3 and below)
 Forfeiture of 7 days base pay
 Reduction by one grade, if original rank in promotion authority of imposing officer (USA/USAF E-4 and below)
 Admonition or reprimand, either written or verbal

Field Grade (O-4 to O-6) may impose:
 Restriction for not more than 60 days
 Extra duties for not more than 45 days
 Restriction with extra duties for not more than 45 days
 Correctional Custody for not more than 30 days (only if accused is in the grades E-3 and below)
 Forfeiture of ½ of base pay for two months
 Reduction by one grade if (USA/USAF E-6 or E-5; USMC E-5 or below; USN E-6 or below); or reduction to E-1 (USA/USAF E-4 to E-2)
 Admonition or reprimand, either written or verbal

The punishments listed above may be combined (with certain limitations listed in the Manual for Courts-Martial, Part 5, Section 5(d)). For example, extra duties, restriction and forfeiture of pay, and reduction in grade could be imposed.

If the member considers the punishment to be unjust or to be disproportionate to the misconduct committed, he or she may appeal the NJP to a higher authority. This is usually the next officer in the chain of command. Upon considering the appeal, the higher authority may set aside the NJP, decrease the severity of the punishment, or may deny the appeal. They may not increase the severity of the punishment.

Personnel are permitted to refuse NJP in favor of a court-martial; this might be done in cases where they do not feel their Commanding Officer will give them a fair hearing. But this option exposes them to a possible criminal court conviction. Navy and Marine Corps personnel assigned to or embarked aboard ship do not have the option of refusing NJP, nor can they appeal the decision of the officer imposing punishment; they may only appeal the severity of the punishment.

Mast
In naval tradition, mast is the traditional location of the non-judicial hearing under which a commanding officer studies and disposes of cases involving those in his command. In the United States Navy and United States Coast Guard, these proceedings take place under the authority of Article 15 of the Uniform Code of Military Justice (UCMJ). 

If the individual conducting the proceeding is either a captain, or a lower ranking officer (typically a commander or lieutenant commander) serving as commanding officer of a naval or coast guard vessel, an aviation squadron, or similar command afloat or ashore, then the proceeding is referred to as a captain's mast. 

If an admiral is overseeing the mast, then the procedure is referred to as an admiral's mast or a flag mast.

A captain's mast or admiral's mast is a procedure whereby the commanding officer must:
 Make inquiry into the facts surrounding minor offenses allegedly committed by a member of the command;
 Afford the accused a hearing as to such offenses; and
 Dispose of such charges by dismissing the charges, imposing punishment under the provisions of military law or referring the case to a court-martial.

A captain's mast is not:
 A trial, as the term "non-judicial" implies;
 A conviction, even if punishment is imposed;
 An acquittal, even if punishment is not imposed.

The term mast may also refer to when a captain or commanding officer makes him/herself available to hear concerns, complaints, or requests from the crew. Traditionally, on a naval vessel, the captain would stand at the main mast of that vessel when holding mast. The crew, who by custom did not speak with the captain, could speak to him directly at these times. It could also refer to the naval punishment of tying one to a mast and lashing them with a whip.

In modern times, a meritorious mast refers to the commanding officer taking this time to single out a member of the crew for praise and present written recognition of work well done.

See also
 Military law
 Extrajudicial punishment
 Military tribunals in the United States
 Courts-martial in the United States

References

External links
 Navy JAG Site
 10 USC 815 (Article 15 - Non-Judicial Punishment)

Military law